Walter Rupprecht (date of birth unknown; died 21 July 1954) was a Swiss footballer who played for FC Basel. He played in the position as defender.

Between the years 1915 and 1924 Rupprecht played a total of 17 games for Basel, scoring one goal. Five of these games were in the Swiss Serie A and twelve were friendly games. He only scored one goal and this was in the test game that Basel played in the Landhof on 14 October 1917. The game against Young Fellows Zürich ended with a 3–2 victory. Rupprecht scored Basel's third goal.

References

Sources
 Rotblau: Jahrbuch Saison 2017/2018. Publisher: FC Basel Marketing AG. 
 Die ersten 125 Jahre. Publisher: Josef Zindel im Friedrich Reinhardt Verlag, Basel. 
 Verein "Basler Fussballarchiv" Homepage

FC Basel players
Swiss men's footballers
Association football defenders
1954 deaths